Fernando de Argüello  was a Spanish soldier who served as Governor of New Mexico, between 1644 and 1647.

Career
Fernando de Arguello Carvajal joined the Spanish Army in his youth, and eventually became a Captain.

Arguello was appointed Governor of Santa Fe de Nuevo México  on 6 December 1644.

During the Fernando de Arguello administration, a conspiracy was formed by the Jemez Pueblo. Arguello was warned of a possible joint revolt of the Jemez and Apache peoples. The Jemez and Apache were thinking of revolting because of Spanish settlements in New Mexico and Franciscan abuse against them. After the revolt, Arguello hanged twenty-nine Jemez for treason and alliance with the Apaches. Forty other Native Americans were whipped and imprisoned.

However, on 4 May 1647, Carvajal was sent to Mexico City and imprisoned for offences against the Crown. However, Arguello fled to somewhere near Parral (in Chihuahua, modern Mexico). All the properties he had were appropriated and destroyed and the Spanish Crown sent another military force to Santa Fe de Mexico City to replace him as governor of the province. The Crown appointed to Luis de Guzmán y Figueroa in place Arguello as governor of New Mexico.

References 

Colonial governors of Santa Fe de Nuevo México